Radiation Measurement may refer to:

 Ionizing radiation#Measurement
 Radiometry, a set of techniques for measuring electromagnetic radiation of any wavelength
 Radiation Measurements (journal), a peer-reviewed academic journal